Lexington Street may refer to:

 Lexington Street, Baltimore, Maryland, USA, a street in downtown Baltimore
 Lexington Street, Waltham, Massachusetts, USA, containing the North Lexington Street Historic District
 Lexington Street, Soho, London, England, UK, a famous street in the Soho district

See also
 Lexington Avenue (disambiguation)
 Lexington (disambiguation)